Escorted tours are a form of tourism in which travelers are escorted in a group to various destinations; they differ from a self-guided tour, when the tourist is not part of an organised group.

Escorted tours (in US English) are also known as Guided tours or Package Tours.

Escorted tours are normally conducted by a tour director who takes care of all services from the beginning to end of the tour. Escorted tours normally include accommodation, transport, meals and some sightseeing. Escorted tours are often conducted by motor coach and usually no more than three nights are spent in each location visited. They are usually fast-paced and prices includes almost everything.

See also
 Brendan Sheerin
 Coach Trip
 Heritage trail
 Walking tour

Notes

Further reading
 Pond, Kathleen Lingle. The Professional Guide: Dynamics of Tour Guiding. New York: Van Nostrand Reinhold, 1993.
 Wynn, Jonathan R. The Tour Guide: Walking and Talking New York. Chicago: The University of Chicago Press, 2011.
 Wynn, Jonathan R. "City Tour Guides: Urban Alchemists at Work." City & Community 9, no. 2 (June 2010).

Types of tourism

Tourist activities